Jenő Jendrassik (Budapest, 1860 – Kökényesd, 1919) was a Hungarian painter whose work is exhibited in the Hungarian National Gallery.

References 

1860 births
1919 deaths
19th-century Hungarian painters
20th-century Hungarian painters
Hungarian male painters
19th-century Hungarian male artists
20th-century Hungarian male artists